An albarello is a type of maiolica earthenware jar.

Albarello may also refer to:

Albarello (grape), a red wine grape variety
Albarello (surname), Italian surname

See also 
 Albarella (disambiguation)
 Albarelli